Curtis M. Graves (born August 26, 1938) is an American civil rights activist, a former politician in the state of Texas and photographer.

Early life 
Graves was born in New Orleans, Louisiana in 1938 to Joseph and Mable Graves.

Career 
He was a member of the Texas House of Representatives from 1967 to 1973 as a Democrat. Along with Barbara Jordan and Joe Lockridge, he was one of three African-American members elected in 1966, the first ones since 1896. Graves was a major force in the Civil Rights Movement who he worked with Dr. Martin Luther King Jr.

A businessman, he is an alumnus of Texas Southern University and Princeton University. He also worked for NASA's academic affairs division and as Director for Civil Affairs. Graves currently is an artistic photographer.

Personal life 
He was married to Joanne Graves, with whom he had three children. One of his children is Gizelle Bryant, star of The Real Housewives of Potomac and former wife of megachurch pastor Jamal Bryant.  

On his maternal side Graves is cousin to Marc Morial, President and CEO of the National Urban League and former New Orleans mayor. 

Curtis is currently married to Kay Bryant and resides in Atlanta, Georgia.

References 

Living people
1938 births
Democratic Party members of the Texas House of Representatives
African-American politicians
African-American people in Texas politics
Louisiana Creole people
People from New Orleans
People from Houston
Photographers from Texas
Politicians from New Orleans
Princeton University alumni
Texas Southern University alumni